Victor Leonard Floyd (born January 24, 1966) is a former American football running back in the National Football League (NFL) who played for the San Diego Chargers. He played college football for the Florida State Seminoles. He also played in the World League of American Football (WLAF) for the Sacramento Surge and New York/New Jersey Knights and in the Arena Football League (AFL) for the Orlando Predators.

References

1966 births
Living people
American football running backs
San Diego Chargers players
Sacramento Surge players
New York/New Jersey Knights players
Orlando Predators players
Florida State Seminoles football players